Jayaweera Bandara (born 5 February 1970) is a Sri Lankan former first-class cricketer who played for Colombo Cricket Club.

References

External links
 

1970 births
Living people
Sri Lankan cricketers
Colombo Cricket Club cricketers